Marcel Labine (born 25 February 1948) is a Quebec poet.

He graduated from the Université de Montréal.

He taught literature at Maisonneuve College in Montreal from 1971 to 2004. He contributed to several periodicals including Spiral, Red Herbs, Moebius and New Bar.

Works 
 Lisse, [Montréal: Herbes rouges], 0441-6627; 31, 1975, [28] p.; 20 cm
 Marcel Labine, Normand de Bellefeuille, L'appareil, [Montréal: Herbes rouges], 0441-6627; 38, 1976, [44] p.; 20 cm
 Les lieux domestiques, [Montréal: Herbes rouges], 0441-6627; 49, 1977, 22 p.; 20 cm
 Les allures de ma mort, [Montréal: Herbes rouges], 0441-6627; 73, 1979
 La marche de la dictée, [Montréal: Herbes rouges], 0441-6627; 83, 1980, 24 p.; 20 cm
 Des trous dans l'anecdote, [Montréal: Herbes rouges], 0441-6627; 87, 1981, 25 p.; 20 cm
 Les proses graduelles, [Montréal: Herbes rouges], 0441-6627; 96, 1981, 21 p.; 20 cm
 Normand de Bellefeuille, Marcel Labine, Les matières de ce siècle, [Montréal: Herbes rouges], 0441-6627; 130, 1984, 42 p.; 20 cm 
 Les lieux domestiques: poésie et prose, 1975-1987, Montréal: Les Herbes rouges, coll. « Enthousiasme », 1997, 208 p.; 21 cm 
 Musiques, dernier mouvement, Outremont: NJ, coll. « Auteur/e », 1987, 69 p.; 23 cm  — Note: Constitute le no 212 de La Nouvelle barre du jour
 Papiers d'épidémie: poésie, Montréal: Herbes rouges, 1987, 40 p.; 21 cm 
 Territoires fétiches: poésie (première éd. en 1990), Montréal: Les Herbes rouges, 2001, 104 p.; 19 cm 
 Machines imaginaires: poésie, Montréal: Les Herbes rouges, 1993, 60 p.: 2 ill.; 21 cm 
 Papiers d'épidémie: poésie; suivi de Le chiffre de l'émotion: entretien avec André Lamarre, Montréal: Les Herbes rouges, 1994, 115 p.; 21 cm 
 Territoires fétiches: poésie, Montréal: Les Herbes rouges, 1996, 104 p.; 21 cm  and 978-2-8941-9192-7
 Carnages: poésie, Montréal: Les Herbes rouges, 1997, 118 p.; 21 cm 
 Le roman américain en question [essai], Montréal: Éditions Québec Amérique, coll. « En question », 2002, 142 p.; 21 cm , 978-2-7644-1904-5 and 978-2-7644-1533-7
 Le pas gagné: poésie, Montréal: Les Herbes rouges, 2005, 173 p.; 21 cm  and 978-2-8941-9244-3
 Le tombeau où nous courons, Montréal: Les Herbes rouges, 2012 
 Promenades dans nos dépôts lapidaires, Montréal: Les Herbes rouges, 2013, 120 p.

Honors 
 1988: Prix du Gouverneur général, Papiers d'épidémie
 1988: Prix d'excellence pour le meilleur texte de fiction de l'Association des éditeurs de périodiques culturels québécois, Musiques, dernier mouvement
 1994: Finalist Prix du Gouverneur général, Machines imaginaires
 2006: Grand prix Québecor du Festival international de la poésie, Le pas gagné
 2012: Bourse d'écriture Gabrielle-Roy
 2013: Prix du Festival de la poésie de Montréal, Le tombeau où nous courons
 2013: Finaliste du Prix de poésie Estuaire - Bistro Leméac, Le tombeau où nous courons

References 

Writers from Quebec
1948 births
Living people
Canadian male poets
Canadian poets in French
20th-century Canadian poets
20th-century Canadian male writers
21st-century Canadian poets
Governor General's Award-winning poets
Université de Montréal alumni
21st-century Canadian male writers